Artūras Jomantas (born May 4, 1985) is a Lithuanian professional basketball player who plays for Dzūkija Alytus of the Lithuanian Basketball League.

Professional career
Born in Skuodas, Lithuania, he made his debut with Mažeikiai (Lithuania) during the 2002-03 championship. He played high-school basketball at Laurinburg Normal HS. He signed for the 2003–04 season by Mažeikiai. He signed for the 2004-05 season by Šiauliai and played there until the end of the 2005–06 season. He signed for the 2006-07 season by Lietuvos Rytas. Despite being a solid player at first, his career in Lietuvos rytas quickly went downward, and he was eventually released in May 2013. In August 2013 it was announced that Jomantas signed with BC Pieno žvaigždės.

Career statistics

EuroLeague

|-
| style="text-align:left;"| 2007–08
| style="text-align:left;"| Lietuvos Rytas
| 20 || 7 || 23.0 || .529 || .429 || .717 || 4.1 || 1.7 || 1.1 || .2 || 6.3 || 8.3
|-
| style="text-align:left;"| 2009–10
| style="text-align:left;"| Lietuvos Rytas
| 10 || 10 || 32.1 || .571 || .294 || .727 || 4.7 || 2.8 || 1.5 || .1 || 9.5 || 11.5
|-
| style="text-align:left;"| 2010–11
| style="text-align:left;"| Lietuvos Rytas
| 12 || 5 || 16.4 || .412 || .214 || .750 || 2.2 || 1.0 || .4 || .1 || 2.4 || 2.5
|-
| style="text-align:left;"| 2012–13
| style="text-align:left;"| Lietuvos Rytas
| 3 || 3 || 25.0 || .250 || .286 || 1.000 || 4.0 || 1.0 || .7 || .0 || 4.0 || 6.3

Awards and achievements

LKL, Baltic Basketball League, LKF Vice-Champion - 2008
He was named the 2007-08 Euroleague Week-2 MVP.
He won the 2007 Baltic League with BC Lietuvos rytas.
He played in the 2005 Lithuanian All Star Game.
He played in the 2006 FIBA EuroCup All Star Game.
He played in 2007 Baltic League All Star Game.
He has been member of the Lithuanian U-16, U-18, U-20 and U-21 National Team.
He played at the 2001 European U-16 Championship.
He won the silver medal at the 2003 World U-18 Championship.
He won the silver medal at the 2005 European U-20 Championship.
He won the bronze medal at the 2005 European U-20 Championship.
He won the gold medal at the 2005 World Under-21 Championship.
LKF cup winner: 2009
LKL second place winner: 2007, 2008
ULEB Eurocup champion 2009
Euroleague MVP of the Week - Season 2007-08, Week 2, against Maccabi Tel Aviv B.C.

References

External links
 Eurobasket Profile

1985 births
Living people
BC Dzūkija players
BC Pieno žvaigždės players
BC Rytas players
BC Šiauliai players
Forwards (basketball)
Lithuanian men's basketball players
People from Skuodas